Syamyon Georgiyevich Sharetski was the last acting Chairman of the Supreme Soviet of Belarus.

August 21, 1999, when the 1995–1999 term of the presidency of Lukashenko ended, the deputies of the Supreme Soviet of Belarus which remained faithful of the 1994 Constitution of Belarus (but actually out of power), appointed Sharetsky Acting President of the Republic of Belarus.

During 1999-2001 he lived in Vilnius, Lithuania, where he was treated as a representative of the legitimate power of Belarus. Since 2001 he lives in the US, where he was given a status of political refugee.

References

1936 births
Living people
Members of the Supreme Council of Belarus
Presidents of Belarus
Foreign Members of the Russian Academy of Sciences